Nizhniy Ayryum is a rural locality (a selo) in Ayryumovskoye Rural Settlement of Giaginsky District, Adygea, Russia. The population was 264 as of 2018. There are 4 streets.

Geography 
Nizhniy Ayryum is located 16 km east of Giaginskaya (the district's administrative centre) by road. Novy and Obraztsovoye are the nearest rural localities.

References 

Rural localities in Giaginsky District